This is a list of Dutch football transfers for the 2017–18 winter transfer window by club. Only transfers of clubs in the Eredivisie are included.

Eredivisie

ADO Den Haag

In:

Out:

Ajax

In:

Out:

AZ

In:

Out:

Excelsior

In:

Out:

Feyenoord

In:

Out:

Van Persie (from Turkey)

Groningen

In:

Out:

Heerenveen

In:

Out:

Heracles Almelo

In:

Out:

NAC Breda

In:

Out:

PEC Zwolle

In:

Out:

PSV

In:

Out:

Roda JC

In:

Out:

Sparta Rotterdam

In:

Out:

Twente

In:

Out:

Utrecht

In:

Out:

Vitesse

In:

Out:

VVV-Venlo

In:

Out:

Willem II

In:

Out:

References

Dutch
tran
2017-18